Bacteria Cult is a collaborative album by Faith No More's Mike Patton and the Norwegian composer John Erik Kaada, within their project Kaada/Patton. The previous releases from the two artists are Romances (2004) and Kaada/Patton Live (2007)

The music is composed and performed by Kaada and Patton. The orchestrations are done by Kaada.

Track listing 
 Red rainbow
 Black Albino
 Peste bubónica
 Papillon
 Dispossession
 A burnt out case
 Imodium
 Fountain gasoline

Album credits 

 Orchestra : Stavanger Symphony Orchestra
 Executive orchestra producer : Eirik Oliver
 Orchestra co-producer Gaute Aadnesen
 Orchestra Manager : Glenn Paulsen
 Conductor : Trond Husebø
 Recording Stage Manager : Stein Holdhus
 Recording engineer : Åsgeir Grong
 Recording assistant : Øyvind Grong
 Music Preparation : Lars Brenli
 Score coordinator : Helen Farr
 Additional tuba & trombone : Børre Mølstad
 Additional Violin : Yi Yang
 Additional Cello : Johannes Martens
 Additional Double Bass : Kenneth Ryland
 Mastered by Frank Arkwright at Abbey Road Studios
 Cover design: Martin Kvamme

External links
official homepage
Review on AllMusic
Pitchfork article

2016 albums
Ipecac Recordings albums
Kaada albums
Mike Patton albums
Collaborative albums